In enzymology, a saccharopine dehydrogenase (NADP+, L-glutamate-forming) is an enzyme that catalyzes the chemical reaction

N6-(L-1,3-dicarboxypropyl)-L-lysine + NADP+ + H2O  L-glutamate + L-2-aminoadipate 6-semialdehyde + NADPH + H+

The 3 substrates of this enzyme are N6-(L-1,3-dicarboxypropyl)-L-lysine, NADP+, and H2O, whereas its 4 products are L-glutamate, L-2-aminoadipate 6-semialdehyde, NADPH, and H+.

This enzyme belongs to the family of oxidoreductases, specifically those acting on the CH-NH group of donors with NAD+ or NADP+ as acceptor.  The systematic name of this enzyme class is N6-(L-1,3-dicarboxypropyl)-L-lysine:NADP+ oxidoreductase (L-glutamate-forming). Other names in common use include saccharopine (nicotinamide adenine dinucleotide phosphate,, glutamate-forming) dehydrogenase, aminoadipic semialdehyde-glutamic reductase, aminoadipate semialdehyde-glutamate reductase, aminoadipic semialdehyde-glutamate reductase, epsilon-N-(L-glutaryl-2)-L-lysine:NAD+(P) oxidoreductase, (L-2-aminoadipate-semialdehyde forming), saccharopine reductase, 6-N-(L-1,3-dicarboxypropyl)-L-lysine:NADP+ oxidoreductase, and (L-glutamate-forming).  This enzyme participates in lysine biosynthesis and lysine degradation.

Structural studies

References

 

EC 1.5.1
NADPH-dependent enzymes
Enzymes of known structure